= Hope Whisper =

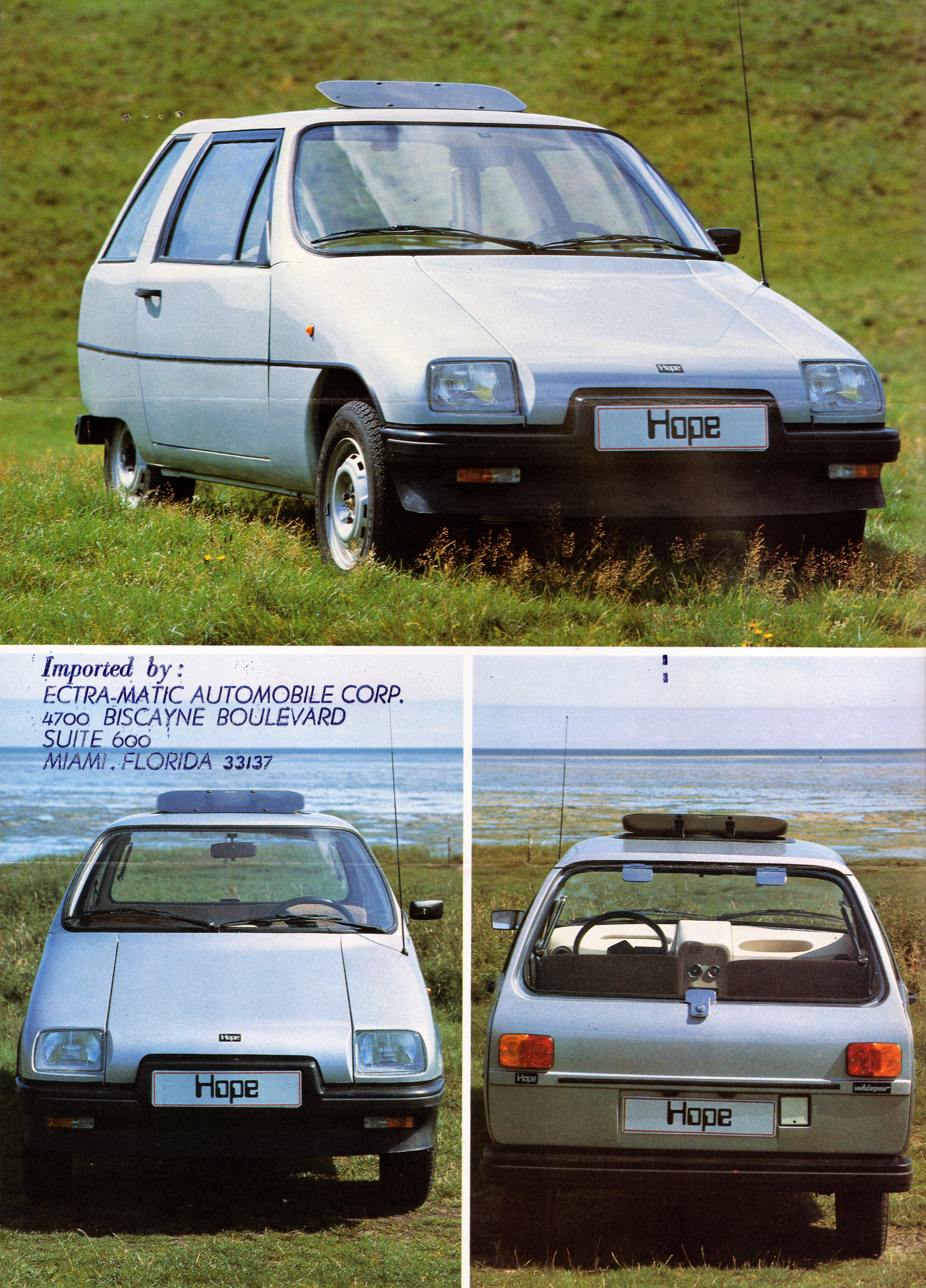
Hope Whisper

The Hope Whisper was an electric car developed in Denmark in 1983. The sole model crashed at the unveiling when the car rolled away during the photoshoot and hit a barrier. It did not reach production.

The Whisper was a compact four-seater city car (two adults and two children), with a claimed range of 62 miles and a top speed of 50 mph. It has a glass fibre body and was 3,500 mm (136 in) long.

In 1985, a Whisper II was developed with Berlin University but funding for production was again not forthcoming.
